Jacobson v. Massachusetts, 197 U.S. 11 (1905), was a United States Supreme Court case in which the Court upheld the authority of states to enforce compulsory vaccination laws. The Court's decision articulated the view that individual liberty is not absolute and is subject to the police power of the state. Jacobson has been invoked in numerous other Supreme Court cases as an example of a baseline exercise of the police power.

Background 
Massachusetts was one of 11 states that had compulsory vaccination laws. Massachusetts law empowered the board of health of individual cities and towns to enforce mandatory, free vaccinations for adults over the age of 21 if the municipality determined it was necessary for the public health or safety of the community. Adults who refused were subject to a $5 fine (about $ in  dollars). In 1902, faced with an outbreak of smallpox, the Board of Health of the city of Cambridge, Massachusetts adopted a regulation ordering the vaccination or revaccination of all its inhabitants.

Cambridge pastor Henning Jacobson had lived through an era of mandatory vaccinations back in his original home of Sweden. Although the efforts to eradicate smallpox were successful in Sweden, Jacobson's childhood vaccination had gone badly, leaving him with a "lifelong horror of the practice". Jacobson refused vaccination saying that "he and his son had had bad reactions to earlier vaccinations" as children and that Jacobson himself "had been caused great and extreme suffering for a long period by a disease produced by vaccination". Jacobson believed that his family may have some sort of hereditary condition that made the smallpox vaccine particularly dangerous. Because of his refusal to get vaccinated, Jacobson was prosecuted and fined $5. Over the next three years until his case reached the Supreme Court of the United States, Jacobson argued that subjecting him to a fine or imprisonment for neglecting or refusing vaccination was an invasion of his liberty, the law was "unreasonable, arbitrary and oppressive", and that one should not be subjected to the law if he or she objects to vaccination, no matter the reason.

Decision 

Justice John Marshall Harlan delivered the decision for a 7–2 majority that the Massachusetts law did not violate the Fourteenth Amendment. The Court held that "in every well ordered society charged with the duty of conserving the safety of its members the rights of the individual in respect of his liberty may at times, under the pressure of great dangers, be subjected to such restraint, to be enforced by reasonable regulations, as the safety of the general public may demand" and that "[r]eal liberty for all could not exist under the operation of a principle which recognizes the right of each individual person to use his own [liberty], whether in respect of his person or his property, regardless of the injury that may be done to others."

Furthermore, the Court held that mandatory vaccinations are neither arbitrary nor oppressive so long as they do not "go so far beyond what was reasonably required for the safety of the public". In Massachusetts, with smallpox being "prevalent and increasing in Cambridge", the regulation in question was "necessary in order to protect the public health and secure the public safety". The Court noted that Jacobson had offered proof that there were many in the medical community who believed that the smallpox vaccine would not stop the spread of the disease and, in fact, may cause other diseases of the body. However, the opinions offered by Jacobson were "more formidable by their number than by their inherent value" and "[w]hat everybody knows, ... [the] opposite theory accords with the common belief and is maintained by high medical authority." Therefore, it was left to the legislature, not the courts, to determine which of the "two modes was likely to be the most effective for the protection of the public against disease". No one could "confidently assert that the means prescribed by the State to that end has no real or substantial relation to the protection of the public health and the public safety".

In conclusion, the Court acknowledged that, in "extreme cases", for certain individuals "in a particular condition of ... health", the requirement of vaccination would be "cruel and inhuman[e]", in which case, courts would be empowered to interfere in order to "prevent wrong and oppression". However, the statute in question was not "intended to be applied to such a case" and Jacobson "did not offer to prove that, by reason of his then condition, he was, in fact, not a fit subject of vaccination". The two dissenters in the Court, David J. Brewer, "one of the most influential justices [on] the court at the time", and Rufus Peckham, "a champion of economic liberty", did not write dissenting opinions.

Precedent 

Harlan's decision supported both police power and limits on the power, and his decision would be invoked to support both in later cases. He stated his nuanced opinion on the limits of government power by saying that "general terms should be so limited in their application as not to lead to injustice, oppression or absurd consequence".

Subsequent developments 

The anti-vaccine movement mobilized following the decision, and the Anti-Vaccination League of America was founded three years later to promote the principle that "health is nature's greatest safeguard against disease and that therefore no State has the right to demand of anyone the impairment of his or her health". The League warned about what it believed to be the dangers of vaccination and the dangers of allowing the intrusion of government and science into private life, part of the broader process identified with the Progressive Movement. The League asked, "We have repudiated religious tyranny; we have rejected political tyranny; shall we now submit to medical tyranny?".

The Supreme Court reaffirmed its decision in Jacobson in Zucht v. King (1922), which held that a school system could refuse admission to a student who failed to receive a required vaccination. Jacobson has been invoked in numerous other Supreme Court cases as an example of a baseline exercise of the police power, with cases relying on it including Buck v. Bell, 274 U.S. 200 (1927) (sterilization of those with intellectual disabilities), Prince v. Massachusetts, 321 U.S. 158 (1944) (limitations on parents having children distribute pamphlets in the street), Cruzan v. Director, Missouri Department of Health, 497 U.S. 261 (1990) (allowing a state to require "clear and convincing evidence" of a patient's wishes for removal of life support), Vernonia School District 47J v. Acton, 515 U.S. 646 (1995) (allowing random drug testing of students), and Gonzales v. Carhart, 550 U.S. 124 (2007) (upholding the federal "partial birth abortion" ban).

The global eradication of smallpox, brought about by an international vaccination campaign, was certified in 1980.

During the COVID-19 pandemic, the federal United States Court of Appeals for the Fifth Circuit relied on Jacobson when upholding a Texas regulation halting abortions by including it in its ban on non-essential medical services and surgeries, consistent with Justice Blackmun's citing of the case in Roe v. Wade. (See Impact of the COVID-19 pandemic on abortion in the United States.) Jacobson also has been a precedent case in justifying government face mask orders and stay-at-home orders throughout the COVID-19 pandemic.

The closest COVID-19-related lawsuit to a direct challenge to Jacobson was Does v. Mills, which challenged Maine's vaccine mandate for health care workers. By a 6–3 vote, the Supreme Court in 2021 denied relief to those who were seeking an injunction on the mandate.

See also

 List of United States Supreme Court cases
 List of United States Supreme Court cases, volume 197
 List of United States Supreme Court cases by the Fuller Court
 Compagnie Francaise de Navigation a Vapeur v. Louisiana Board of Health, case three years earlier where the Court had upheld quarantine laws as a reasonable exercise of police power
 National Federation of Independent Business v. Occupational Safety and Health Administration (2022), case in which OSHA mandating COVID-19 vaccines was ruled as too powerful.
 Vaccination policy
 Vaccine controversies

References

Sources
 George J. Annas, "Blinded by Bioterrorism: Public Health and Liberty in the 21st Century", Health Matrix (2003)
 James Colgrove and Ronald Bayer, "The Legacy of Jacobson v Massachusetts: Manifold Restraints: Liberty, Public Health, and the Legacy of Jacobson v Massachusetts Manifold Restraints: Liberty, Public Health, and the Legacy of Jacobson v. Massachusetts], American Journal of Public Health, vol. 95, no. 4 (2005), 571–576
 Lawrence O. Gostin, "Jacobson v. Massachusetts at 100 Years: Police Power and Civil Liberties in Tension", American Journal of Public Health, vol. 95, no. 4 (2005), 576–581
 Wendy K. Mariner et al., "Jacobson v. Massachusetts: It's Not Your Great-Great-Grandfather's Public Health Law", American Journal of Public Health, vol. 95, no. 4 (2005)
 Michael Willrich, Pox: An American History (Penguin, 2011)

External links
 

1905 in United States case law
Health law in the United States
Legal history of Massachusetts
Smallpox vaccines
United States administrative case law
United States Supreme Court cases
United States Supreme Court cases of the Fuller Court
Vaccination law
Vaccine controversies
Vaccination in the United States